{| align="right" class="toccolours"

|-
|colspan=2 align="center" |Palatinate-Sulzbach-HilpoltsteinPfalz-Sulzbach-Hilpoltstein
|-
|colspan=2 align="center" |1614 - 1644''
|-
|
|-
|width=138px| CapitalCircleBench|width=138px| Hilpoltsteinnonenone
|-
|Partitioned from Palatinate-Neuburg
|1614
|-
|Extinct; to Palatinate-Sulzbach
|1644
|-
|}Palatinate-Sulzbach-Hilpoltstein''' was a state of the Holy Roman Empire based around Hilpoltstein in modern central Bavaria, Germany.

Palatinate-Sulzbach-Hilpoltstein was created in 1614 out of the partition of the territories of Philip Louis of Palatinate-Neuburg for his youngest son John Frederick. John Frederick died in 1644 without heirs so Sulzbach-Hilpoltstein was inherited by Palatinate-Sulzbach.

House of Wittelsbach
Counties of the Holy Roman Empire